Callum Johnson (born November 1, 1997) is an American soccer player who currently plays as a midfielder for One Knoxville in USL League One.

Career

Youth
Johnson attended the Collegiate School, playing club soccer for BW Gottschee, before spending a year with the New York Red Bulls academy from 2015.

College
In 2016, Johnson attended Boston College to play college soccer. He played three seasons for the Eagles between 2016 and 2018, making 52 appearances, scoring eight goals and tallying ten assists, missing the 2019 season due to injury. In 2017, he was named Boston College's Male Sophomore Scholar-Athlete of the Year. In 2020, Johnson transferred to Clemson University, where he made 43 appearances, scoring eight goals and adding nine assists.

In 2019, Johnson was part of the New York Red Bulls U-23 side who compete in the USL League Two, but didn't make an appearance for them.

Professional
On January 11, 2022, Johnson was selected 42nd overall in the 2022 MLS SuperDraft by LA Galaxy. He was announced as a signing for club's USL Championship side on March 3, 2022. He made his debut for LA Galaxy II on June 18, 2022, appearing as a 68th–minute substitute during a 2–0 loss to Sacramento Republic.

Johnson signed with USL League One expansion club One Knoxville on January 26, 2023.

References

External links
 

1997 births
Living people
Association football midfielders
American soccer players
Boston College Eagles men's soccer players
Clemson Tigers men's soccer players
LA Galaxy draft picks
LA Galaxy II players
New York Red Bulls U-23 players
One Knoxville SC players
Soccer players from New York (state)
USL Championship players